Stella Gaitano (b. 1979 in Khartoum, Sudan) is a literary writer and pharmacist from South Sudan. She is known for her stories often dealing with the harsh living conditions of people from southern Sudan, who have endured discrimination and military dictatorship, or war and displacement in the northern part of Sudan. Since the independence of South Sudan in 2011, she has also published short stories about life in her new nation.

Life and career 
Gaitano was born in Khartoum to parents who came from what is now South Sudan. She grew up speaking several languages, including Sudanese Arabic and her parents' native Latuka, a South Sudanese language. At the University of Khartoum, she studied in English and standard Arabic. She prefers writing in Arabic. In an article for the New York Times by Sudanese journalist Isma’il Kushkush, Gaitano said: "I love the Arabic language, and I adore writing in it. It is the linguistic mold that I want to fill my personal stories and culture in, distinguished from that of Arabs." She added: "It was important for me that northern Sudanese realize that there was life, values and a people who held a different culture, who needed space to be recognized and respected." Gaitano has said she was inspired to write after reading Sudanese novelist Tayeb Salih, and Arabic translations of Gabriel García Márquez and Isabel Allende.

In 2012, Gaitano moved to Juba, the capital of South Sudan, where she worked as a pharmacist while also pursuing her literary career. Gaitano fled from South Sudan to Khartoum in 2015, after having been harassed and attacked due to her criticism of the South Sudanese government for what she saw as its mismanagement, corruption, and its role in the South Sudanese civil war.

Withered Flowers (2002), Gaitano's first short story collection, tells the stories of people who have been displaced by conflicts in southern Sudan, Darfur, and the Nuba mountains, and were forced to live in camps near Khartoum. She wrote these stories between 1998 and 2002, when she was still a student. According to literary critic Marcia Lynx Qualey, "This early work demonstrates vibrant wordplay, fearless empathy and a deep understanding of storycraft."

In her second collection The Return (2018), Gaitano described the journey of South Sudanese people from the North to their newly created country. She described her characters' expectations and great hopes, and their even greater disappointments. In 2016, her Testimony of a Sudanese Writer was featured in the English literary magazine Banipal'''s spring edition, titled "Sudanese Literature Today." 

At an exhibition for Sudanese painter Ibrahim el-Salahi at the Museum of Modern Art in New York City in 2019, Gaitano was invited to use el-Salahi's Prison Notebook as a source of inspiration for a fictional narrative, and she focused her story The Rally of the Sixth of April on a fictional Sudanese photographer documenting the Sudanese Revolution of 2018/19. 

In 2020, her Eddo’s Souls was the first South Sudanese novel to win the English PEN writers Translates Award. According to a review in literary magazine ArabLit, "The novel begins across a rural context, in a small impoverished village full of mystery, rituals, and superstition, and it ends in a jam-packed city with all its complications."

In 2022, Gaitano was awarded a fellowship of the PEN International Writers-in-Exile programme in Germany. On September 11 of that year she participated in the International Literature Festival Berlin on a panel about contemporary Arabic literature, together with novelist Sabah Sanhouri from Khartoum.

 Selected works 
 Short storiesWithered Flowers, short stories,  (2002), English translation by Anthony CalderbankA Lake the Size of a Papaya Fruit, (2003), won the Ali El-Mek Award in SudanThe Return, short stories, Rafiki Publishing, Juba (2015), translated by Asha Musa El-SaidEverything here boilsHomecomingEscape From the RegularI kill myself and rejoice The Rally of the Sixth of April, (2019) (inspired by Ibrahim el-Salahi's prison notebook, in Arabic and English)
 Des mondes inconnus sur la carte (2009) in French anthology Nouvelles du Soudan Novel
 Eddo’s Souls, (2018) English translation by Dedalus Books, excerpt in ArabLit magazine.

 See also 

 Sudanese literature
 List of Sudanese writers

 References 

 Further reading 

 Al-Malik, A., Gaetano, S., Adam, H., Baraka, S. A., Karamallah, A., Mamoun, R., & Luffin, X. (2009). Nouvelles du Soudan.'' Paris: Magellan & Cie. (in French) 
 
 Excerpt of Stella Gaitano's short story "Homecoming", translated by Asha Musa El-Said

1979 births
Living people
South Sudanese writers
21st-century women writers
People from Khartoum
Women novelists
University of Khartoum alumni